Occupy St. Louis (OccupySTL) was a postpartisan people's movement that began on October 1, 2011 as a peaceful protest against corporate greed, its influence over the economy, its corruption of government, and ensuing inequality. Although people possess differing viewpoints and diversity of views is a central tenet, commonly held themes seek an equal playing field in the economy with more equal opportunities for all people as well as accountability for corporate and financial malfeasance. Many of those in the movement argue that structural, systemic change is necessary and that incremental reform is insufficient and in any case not possible without popular countervailing power to the power of moneyed interests. Occupy St. Louis is in solidarity with the Occupy Wall Street movement. It is located at Kiener Plaza in downtown St. Louis near an area which includes many financial institutions such as commercial banks and the Federal Reserve Bank of St. Louis.

As of June 2012, Occupy St. Louis had continued to engage in organized meetings, events and actions.

Overview
Occupy St. Louis consists of concerned citizens and individuals from many different ideologies and backgrounds whom wish to address economic and political issues. It uses consensus decision-making and is a horizontal organization utilizing facilitators in lieu of leaders and has no official spokesperson.

The encampment has consisted of more than fifty tents with a couple hundred continuous occupiers and many hundreds more activists. Several families occupied the space long term. The demographics consist of people from a large racial, gender, and political mix, many people of various ages and class backgrounds, laborers, professionals, large numbers of both employed and unemployed, the underemployed, military veterans, students and teachers, some homeless, as well as those of diverse sexual orientations. People have joined from some distance around the region in addition to the city and metropolitan areas. With the exceptions of views promoting violence or hatred, Occupy St. Louis is open to all political beliefs with Democrats, Republicans, independents, Greens, liberals, progressives, conservatives, libertarians, socialists, anarchists, communists, and the previously nonpolitical, among others, represented among those in the movement.

Actions held by Occupy St. Louis include the occupation of Kiener Plaza, civil disobedience, demonstrations, protest marches, and picketing. OccupySTL has acted in solidarity with at least two strike actions and walkouts and has been supported by various trade unions and many individual unionists from the region. OccupySTL is participating in moving money from large commercial retail banks (in particular, Bank of America) to local credit unions or community oriented banks. It participated in Bank Transfer Day on November 5, 2011. It has called boycotts, supported buy local campaigns, organized mic checks and flash mobs at area stores on Black Friday, and participated in food drives. It cosponsored a "Green Friday" festival with barter trading, a fair trade market, arts and crafts workshops, live music, and roundtable discussions as a sustainable alternative to Black Friday. OccupySTL has also supported and directly assisted a number of families unfairly foreclosed upon.

A large rally and march in alliance with area unions held on October 14 attracted around 1000 people. OccupySTL participated in a rally and march as part of the November 17 Day of Action across the United States and world. This was in conjunction with the Occupy movement as well as local unions, MoveOn.org, and PROMO, among other organizations participating but not necessarily intercoordinating. Approximately 1,000 people marched from Kiener Plaza to the Martin Luther King Bridge, passing by various financial institutions and the regional Federal Reserve Bank before 14 were arrested for blocking traffic on one onramp of the bridge to highlight neglect of infrastructure and jobs. Banners were also unveiled on area overpasses.

There are educational efforts such as daily teach-ins from a variety of organizations. A food tent was established to feed occupiers (as well as some of the city homeless). An on-site library of pamphlets, periodicals, and books has also operated. An interfaith was established by two chaplains, creating a space for interfaith worship, discussion, and fellowship.

Incidents and arrests
Occupy St. Louis initially faced a small number of citations and arrests for violation of the curfew at Kiener Plaza, a city park. Thereafter until November 11, however, the response from the St. Louis Police Department and Mayor Francis G. Slay was relatively less repressive than that of many other cities and there were no large scale arrests, raids, or police violence. The mayor eventually blogged and city officials indicated to the media a list of violations, which was challenged by OccupySTL, as well as an ultimatum that occupiers vacate the plaza after curfew and remove all tents. Coinciding with a nationwide crackdown coordinated by the FBI, in collusion with large financial companies, after 11 pm on Veterans Day, the St. Louis police faced a crowd of about 400 to raid the plaza, arresting approximately 27, and confiscating (with the city parks department) the materials of occupiers left on site. Although there was no rough treatment of people by the police, some of these materials were thrown into garbage trucks and crushed despite explicit assurances that all items would be bagged and tagged for later retrieval by owners. OccupySTL marched in solidarity with the Veterans Day march earlier in the day but its activists challenged pervasive neglect of veterans. Since the Veterans Days eviction, Kiener Plaza has been continuously patrolled by park rangers and the city police who have strictly enforced the ban on tents and the 10 pm-6 am curfew (the latter was not enforced previously and remained unenforced at other parks). A preliminary injunction filed pro bono on behalf of Occupy St. Louis to cease enforcement of the curfew by arguing violations of First Amendment speech rights was denied in the United States District Court for the Eastern District of Missouri.

During mid-March 2015, St. Louis hosted the Occupy the Midwest Conference. On March 15, police without provocation violently arrested occupiers as they were using a crosswalk after exiting Compton Hill Reservoir Park, causing many to be bloodied and permanent injuries on some, including permanent dislocation of one person's jaw. Several protesters were beaten and pepper sprayed, as were news media and documentary camerapeople. On May 24, police violently arrested protesters in an anti-police brutality march held in response to the March incident in St. Louis and to the mass and violent arrests at the 2012 NATO Summit in Chicago on May 20. Several protesters were charged with felonies but all of those charged were acquitted of all charges. One protester, who was beaten in interrogation at a police station and against whom evidence was fabricated, settled a lawsuit for $100,000.

See also

Occupy articles
 List of global Occupy protest locations
 Occupy movement
 Timeline of Occupy Wall Street
 We are the 99%
Other Protests
 15 October 2011 global protests
 1877 Saint Louis general strike
 2011 United States public employee protests
 2011 Wisconsin protests
 Ferguson unrest
 2017 St. Louis protests

Related articles
 Arab Spring
 Corruption Perceptions Index
 Economic inequality
 Corporatism
 Corporatocracy
 Direct action

 Grassroots movement
 Income inequality in the United States
 Lobbying
 Plutocracy
 Precariat
 Tea party protests
 Wealth inequality in the United States

References

External links
 Diaspora*
 Livestream
 Anti-State STL
 OccupySTL Blog (unofficial)
 St. Louis Activist Hub blog

2011 in Missouri
Occupy movement in the United States
2010s in St. Louis
Culture of St. Louis
Organizations based in St. Louis
Political organizations based in St. Louis
Protests in Missouri